To be certain is to have the property of certainty.

Certain may also refer to 

 François Certain, French footballer
 Certain (racehorse)
 "Certain" (song), by Bill Anderson